The Confederation of European Business, shortened as BusinessEurope, is a lobby group representing enterprises of all sizes in the European Union (EU) and seven non-EU European countries. It is made up of 40 national industry and employers' organizations. The current president of the confederation is Fredrik Persson, while the Director General is Markus J. Beyrer.

Based in Brussels, the confederation is officially recognised as a social partner at European level, is involved in a range of economic and social decisions and cooperates with a number of stakeholders and business partners. It promotes the interests of corporate citizens to ensure that public policy supports the European economy. It is generally considered the strongest interest organisation in Brussels and represents 20 million companies through its member trade associations in 35 European countries.

History
In 2014, Unilever terminated its membership in BusinessEurope's Advisory and Support Group because it opposed the organisation's stance on carbon dioxide emissions.

Leadership
The association is led by a president, which has been held by the following persons:

 1958–1961 Léon Bekaert
 1961–1962 Georges Villiers
 1962–1967 H. J. de Koster
 1967–1971 Fritz Berg
 1971–1975 
 1975–1980 
 1981–1983 Guido Carli
 1984–1986 Raymond Pennock
 1986–1990 
 1990–1994 
 1994–1998 François Perigot
 1998–2003 Georges Jacobs
 2003–2005 Jürgen Strube
 2005–2009 Ernest-Antoine Seillière
 2009–2013 
 2013-2018 Emma Marcegaglia
 2018-2022 Pierre Gattaz
 Since July 2022 Fredrik Persson

BusinessEurope is administrated by a director general. Markus J. Beyrer has been holding that position since 2013.

Activities
The Confederation of European Business organises the biannual BusinessEurope Day in Brussels.

Member organisations

See also
European Business Summit
European Trade Union Confederation
EuropeanIssuers

References

Sources
 European Social Partners as recognised by the Treaty of Lisbon
 European Transparency Register
 RFI 20 May 2011
 Europolitique 21 January 2011

External links 
 Official website

Business organizations based in Europe
Employers' organizations
Industry in the European Union
Lobbying organizations in Europe
Lobbying in the European Union
Pan-European trade and professional organizations